Olapade Charles Adeniken (born 19 August 1969 in Osogbo) is a retired Nigerian sprinter who specialized in the 100 and 200 metres, and is the father of Michael Adeniken.

He won the silver medal in 4 x 100 m relay at the 1992 Olympic Games in Barcelona, Spain, together with teammates Chidi Imoh, Oluyemi Kayode and Davidson Ezinwa.

He was the first Nigerian sprinter to break the 10-second barrier in the 100 metres;his personal best time was 9.95 seconds, achieved in April 1994 in El Paso. This ranks him third in Nigeria, only behind Olusoji Fasuba (9.85 s) and Davidson Ezinwa (9.94 s). In 200 metres his personal best time was 20.11 seconds, achieved in June 1992 in Austin. This ranks him third in Nigeria, only behind Francis Obikwelu and Daniel Effiong, and fifth in Africa, behind Frankie Fredericks, Obikwelu, Stéphan Buckland and Effiong.

Achievements

References

External links

1969 births
Athletes (track and field) at the 1988 Summer Olympics
Athletes (track and field) at the 1992 Summer Olympics
Athletes (track and field) at the 1996 Summer Olympics
Athletes (track and field) at the 1994 Commonwealth Games
Living people
Yoruba sportspeople
Nigerian male sprinters
Commonwealth Games competitors for Nigeria
Olympic athletes of Nigeria
Olympic silver medalists for Nigeria
UTEP Miners men's track and field athletes
World Athletics Championships medalists
Sportspeople from Osogbo
Medalists at the 1992 Summer Olympics
Olympic silver medalists in athletics (track and field)
Universiade medalists in athletics (track and field)
Universiade silver medalists for Nigeria
Medalists at the 1989 Summer Universiade
20th-century Nigerian people